Porsche Carrera Cup Scandinavia is a one make racing championship held in Scandinavian countries with the majority of the races being in Sweden. The cars are currently Porsche 911 GT3 Cup (Type 991.2) with 4.0 liters, flat-6 naturally aspirated engines that produce  and 480 N·m.

Inspired by the success of the Porsche Carrera Cup in France and Germany, the first race in the Scandinavian edition was held on 1 May 2004.
Since then it has been one of the support series for the Swedish Touring Car Championship.

Among the competitors are former Speedway World Champion Tony Rickardsson and Prince Carl Philip of Sweden.
There has also been a number of famous guest drivers, like Mika Häkkinen, Kenny Bräck and Dennis Hauger.

The series is organised and maintained by Swedish racing team Flash Engineering that took over running of the series in 2005 when the series was close to bankruptcy. In 2009 the series became the biggest Carrera Cup-series in the world with 35 entries. The series is currently shown live on Viasat Motor.

Champions

References

External links
  
 

Scandinavia
Auto racing series in Sweden
Inter-Nordic sports competitions